As a solo artist, American singer-songwriter Parry Gripp has released three original studio albums, one reissue, one collaborative studio album, two compilation albums, one mixtape, and three extended plays (EPs). Known for his novelty songs, he became an internet sensation after Nathan Magur's animated music video for "Do You Like Waffles?" went viral.

Gripp's career began as the lead vocalist and guitarist of Nerf Herder. He released his first solo album, For Those About to Shop, We Salute You (2005), during the hiatus of Nerf Herder. With 51 tracks under a minute long, it is a concept album of commercial jingles. Gripp's second solo album, Do You Like Waffles? (2008), was released the same year as a collaboration with the Hallmark Cards characters Hoops & Yoyo, focusing exclusively on food. His third solo album and first christmas album, Jingle Burgers, was released in 2020.

Studio albums

Reissues

Collaborative albums

Compilation albums

Mixtapes

Extended plays

See also 
 Nerf Herder discography

References

External links 
 
 
 
 

Discographies of American artists